Praia de Atalanta is a beach on the north coast of the island of Boa Vista in Cape Verde. It is approximately 6 km northeast of the island capital of Sal Rei and 3 km west of Vigía. The wreck of the Spanish cargo ship Cabo Santa Maria, which ran aground on September 1, 1968, is located here.

The beach forms a part of Boa Esperança Nature Reserve which also includes the beaches of Sobrado and Copinha.

References

External links

Cabo de Santa Maria on cabo-verde-foto.com, in English, German and in Portuguese

Beaches of Cape Verde
Geography of Boa Vista, Cape Verde